Concordia is a provincial electoral division in the Canadian province of Manitoba. It is in the northeastern part of the city of Winnipeg.

It is bordered to the south by St. Boniface, to the west by Elmwood, to the north by Rossmere, and to the east by Radisson. The riding was created by redistribution in 1979, and formally came into existence with the provincial election of 1981.

Concordia is an ethnically diverse riding, with 16% of its human population born outside Canada. According to a 1999 census report, 9% of the riding's residents are aboriginal, with a further 9% of German background and 7% of Ukrainian background.

Concordia's population in 1996 was 20,318. The average family income of the riding in 1999 was $39,613, one of the lowest in the province. Thirty-two percent of the riding's residents are listed as low-income, and 21% of its households are single-parent families. The unemployment rate in 1996 was 9.50%.

The riding's primary industry in 1999 was manufacturing (18%), followed by services (14%) and the retail trade (14%).

The New Democratic Party has represented Concordia since its creation. Gary Doer was its Member of the Legislative Assembly (MLA) from 1986, leader of the NDP from 1988, and Premier of Manitoba from 1999; he gave up all three of these positions when he was appointed as Ambassador to the United States in 2009. He had been re-elected in 2003 and 2007 with 77% and 70% of the popular vote. A by-election to succeed Doer was scheduled for March 2, 2010. In the event, Matt Wiebe, who previously worked for Doer as a constituency assistant, retained Concordia for the NDP, and he has continued to represent it since.

List of provincial representatives

Electoral history

1981 general election

1986 general election

1988 general election

1990 general election

1995 general election

1999 general election

2003 general election

2007 general election

2010 by-election

2011 general election

2016 general election

2019 general election

Previous boundaries

References

Manitoba provincial electoral districts
Politics of Winnipeg